This list of Danish consorts includes each queen consort (wife of a reigning king) and each prince consort (husband of a reigning queen). Due to unions (personal and real), the queens of 1380–1814 (effectively from 1406) were also queens of Norway, and the queens of 1389–1521/23 (effectively from 1406) were also (though with interruptions) queens of Sweden.

House of Knýtling

House of Estridsen

House of Pomerania

House of Palatinate-Neumarkt

House of Oldenburg

House of Schleswig-Holstein-Sonderburg-Glücksburg

Notes and references

See also
 List of Danish monarchs
 List of consorts of Schleswig and Holstein
 List of consorts of Oldenburg
 List of Norwegian consorts
 List of Finnish consorts
 List of Swedish consorts

 
Danish consorts, List of
Danish royal consorts, List of
Royal consorts, List of
Danish royal consorts, List of